Puszcza Solska Landscape Park, also known as Solska Forest Landscape Park (Park Krajobrazowy Puszczy Solskiej), is a Polish Landscape Park protected area in southeastern Poland.

It was established in 1988.

Geography
The Park is located within two Polish voivodeships: the Lublin Voivodeship, and Podkarpackie Voivodeship (Subcarpathian Voivodeship).

Within the Lublin Voivodeship the park is: within Biłgoraj County in Gmina Aleksandrów, Gmina Józefów, Gmina Łukowa, and Gmina Obsza; and within Tomaszów Lubelski County in Gmina Susiec.

Within the Podkarpackie Voivodeship (Subcarpathian Voivodeship) the park is within Lubaczów County in Gmina Cieszanów and Gmina Narol.

Features
The Landscape Park contains several distinct nature reserves for preservation of wildlife, including Czartowe Pole, Nad Tanwią, Szum, Bukowy Las, Obary, and Przecinka. There are three separate and protected zones, including the Solska Wilderness Area.

The Janów Forests Landscape Park is also in the area.

See also

Special Protection Areas in Poland

References
 Marcin Karetta, Puszcza Solska at przyroda.polska.pl Retrieved September 25, 2011.

Puszcza Solska
Parks in Lublin Voivodeship
Parks in Podkarpackie Voivodeship
Natura 2000 in Poland
Biłgoraj County
Lubaczów County
Tomaszów Lubelski County
1988 establishments in Poland
Protected areas established in 1988